LA 4, LA-4 or LA Four may refer to:

 Louisiana Highway 4, abbreviated as LA 4
 Louisiana's 4th congressional district, abbreviated as LA-4
 "L.A. Four", the media term for the perpetrators of the 1992 attack on Reginald Denny
 The L.A. Four (band), a 1970s jazz band also known as the L.A. 4
 The Urban Dynamometer Driving Schedule, also known as the LA-4, one of the FTP-75 series of environmental impact tests